Ros na Rún is an Irish soap opera that began broadcasting on TG4 on 3 November 1996. The following is a list of cast and characters who currently appear, or who previously appeared, in the series.

Present characters

Past characters

References 

Irish television soap operas